Rindgea s-signata, the signate looper moth, is a species of geometrid moth in the family Geometridae. It is found in Central America and North America.

The MONA or Hodges number for Rindgea s-signata is 6414.

References

Further reading

 

Macariini
Articles created by Qbugbot
Moths described in 1873